Surprise! It's Edible Incredible! is a Canadian children's game show series produced by Apartment 11 Productions. The series was created by Jean Louis Côté and Paul Vinet, and stars Julie Zwillich as the host, and Mike Paterson as Mr. Gross, and Alex Orlando as the chef.

Format
Each week two contestants unknowingly get to star on the show. They came in the studio when their friends yelled "Surprise" and threw ribbons and streamers. First, The Contestant Sit In The Hot Seat In season 1 it look like a brick Oven in season 2 it look a real oven the a short video is shown with host Julie or Mr. Gross Snooping in the contestants' houses asking their parents which foods they hate/love. Then the contestants face the first challenge, which involves racing around the game studio in search for different kinds of foods on a list that their were given in season 2 Cameras Which Is also worn in the cooking ring; they will need to guess if they are the correct foods or not. Then Julie announces the "Grosstacle" and the two must stop what they are doing and face a challenge which involves eating the foods that they hate, then afterwards, they must go back in search of the foods that they were looking for earlier Then Another Grosstacle Happens where a physical challenge happens the first Person Back Who hit They button would be checked by Mr Gross if they got the correct items in season 1 Both Player Item Are Scanned Individual If They got that item right they get a point In Season 2 Both Players put their item down mr gross tell them who right or wrong or they didn't get that Item Then In season 1 A clue coupon would happened For Bonus Point Mr gross would give up to  three clues first one worth 3 point second worth 2 and third is worth 1 point if Neither player get it Mr gross says the answer it was dropped in season 2. The Contestants Would Watch A cooking where Chef Alex Would show them The Recipe And Julie Would Talk To Alex On The Recipe They are then faced against a cooking challenge in the "Cooking Ring" and are allowed to choose two friends from the audience to help them . Chef Alex Would Rate The Dishes In season 
he give up to 3 points in season 2 it was 5.After Chef Alex Orlando rates their dishes , samples of their food are given to the "Taste Buds" Each Contestant Chooses 5 of their friend To Taste both contestant Food The People that taste the food wear Special Googles So they cant see  . In the end, the contestant with the most highly rated plates wins an "outdoor adventure" trip which they get the option of choosing From 3 Destination In Season 2 It was From 2 Destination in the event of a tie Both Players get to choose a trip. Both players are given a gift just for participating in the show.

Episodes

Season 1

1. Surf and Turf Bob (pilot episode / series premiere)
2. It's a Hot Dog's Life!
3. Surely You Kid, Squid!
4. Lobster Trap
5. Soupy Sprouts
6. Fruit Cakewalk
7. Go Fish!
8. Food on the Run
9. Shinny Shinny Mo Mango Bop
10. Dressed to Chill
11. Tomato Spit
12. Spew Stew
13. Crispy Rice Face
14. Jiggle Toss
15. Pearl Onion Diving
16. Sour Power
17. Chop `n' Plop
18. Great Eggspectations
19. Fish Head Splatter Ball
20. Eye Can't Believe Eye Hate the Whole Thing
21. Popcorn Topping
22. Fortune Cookie Tree
23. Pie in the Sky
24. Chocolate Found-Ehwww!
25. Balanced Breakfast
26. Puddin' Plunge

Season 2

1. Broadway vs Elvis (season premiere)
2. SK8Boarders
3. Battle of the Bands
4. Singer vs Dancer 
5. Brother vs. Sister
6. Going to the Dogs
7. Multitaskers
8. Practical vs. Flowery
9. Double Trouble
10. Karate Kids
11. Hockey vs. Ringette
12. Early Riser vs. Late Sleeper
13. Clash of the Cooks
14. Out of the Fry Pan
15. Small vs. Tall
16. Word Warriors
17. Urban Artists
18. The Faux Show
19. Grossiators
20. Dance Dance Dance
21. Brawn vs. Brawn
22. Mad Scientists
23. The Soccer Princess vs. the Catboy
24. Helping Hands
25. Sing for Your Supper
26. Payback Time! (final episode)

Broadcast

Surprise! It's Edible! Incredible! was broadcast in Canada on CBC Television and BBC Kids. Outside of Canada, the series aired in 90 markets, and was broadcast on Disney XD, MeTV, TCT Kids, Kartoon Channel, Oprah Winfrey Network, Pluto TV Reality and Kabillion in the United States, Pop Girl in the United Kingdom, ABC Me in Australia, and Unis TV. The series was currently nationwide on Kidoodle.TV, YTV,
Starz Kids & Family, CCTV, Kushi TV, Chutti TV, Kochu TV, Chintu TV,  CTV Comedy Channel, Discovery Kids, Science Channel, FamilyNet, Knowledge Network, Nickelodeon Canada, Vme Kids, Utrla Kidz, Canal Panda and other channels.

Cast
Julie Zwillich
Mike Paterson as Mr. Gross
Alex Orlando
 DJ Killa Jewel

References

http://edibleincredible.apartment11.tv/

External links

http://www.cbc.ca/programguide/program/surpriseits_edible_incredible

CBC Kids original programming
2000s Canadian cooking television series
Canadian children's game shows
2000s Canadian game shows
2000s Canadian children's television series